Exfiltration, an antonym for infiltration, may stand for:
 The same as extraction (military) (also exfil)
 A method for managing stormwater runoff
 An air escape from a building, see ventilation (architecture)
 Used as a hacker near-synonym for data theft, unauthorized release of data from within a computer system or network